

History
Singapore Football Club was formed in 2019 upon merging three top amateur football clubs, SCC Firsts, SCC Tigers and Singapore
Wanderers. The club currently has 3 teams competing in 3 top amateur football league in Singapore, Cosmoleague, Equatorial Football league and ESPZEN Midweek League.

References

 https://www.singaporefootballclub.com/
 http://www.cosmoleague.com/teams/view/35/Singapore-Football-Club

Football clubs in Singapore